Sphingomonas oryziterrae  is a Gram-negative and rod-shaped bacteria from the genus of Sphingomonas which has been isolated from rhizosphere soil from rice fields (Oryza sativa) in Jinju in Korea.

References

Further reading

External links
Type strain of Sphingomonas oryziterrae at BacDive -  the Bacterial Diversity Metadatabase	

oryziterrae
Bacteria described in 2011